Lamouri Rahmouni is a paralympic athlete from France competing mainly in category T37 sprint events.

Lamouri has competed in four paralympics winning a total of three medals in two of those games. His two unsuccessful games were his first and last, 1992 when he competed in the 400m, 800m and 1500m and the 2004 where he competed in the 200m, 400m and 800m.  In 1996 he competed in the 800m and won a silver in the 400m.  This silver turned to bronze in the 2000 Summer Paralympics where he also won a silver as part of the French 4 × 100 m relay team.

References

External links 
 

Paralympic athletes of France
Athletes (track and field) at the 1992 Summer Paralympics
Athletes (track and field) at the 1996 Summer Paralympics
Athletes (track and field) at the 2000 Summer Paralympics
Athletes (track and field) at the 2004 Summer Paralympics
Paralympic silver medalists for France
Paralympic bronze medalists for France
Living people
French male sprinters
Medalists at the 1996 Summer Paralympics
Medalists at the 2000 Summer Paralympics
Year of birth missing (living people)
Paralympic medalists in athletics (track and field)
20th-century French people
21st-century French people